Tim and Eric Nite Live! is an American web series, which premiered November 8, 2007 on SuperDeluxe. The talk show stars Tim Heidecker and Eric Wareheim, creators of Tom Goes to the Mayor and Tim and Eric Awesome Show, Great Job!, and consists of a variety of strange segments often featuring Tim and Eric Awesome Show, Great Job! regulars such as David Liebe Hart and James Quall. It also repeatedly features Awesome Show regular Richard Dunn in a sidekick/father-figure type role. It parodies public-access television and talk shows in an absurd and often cringe-worthy style as in Tim and Eric's other works.

The show has seen many guests in its short internet-only SuperDeluxe exclusive run, including John Mayer, Zach Galifianakis, Bob Odenkirk, Will Forte, Rainn Wilson, and Jonah Hill.

Episodes

Reception
by Jason Thompson, Bullz-Eye, "A Chat with Tim Heidecker and Eric Wareheim"
by Dylan P. Gadino, Punchline Magazine, "Tim and Eric: Awesome Interview, Great Job!"
by  Jocelyn Guest, NYMag, "How the Internet Got Awesomer: Tim and Eric’s plan for online domination"

References

External links
 
 Tim and Eric.com

American comedy web series
Tim & Eric
2007 web series debuts
2008 web series endings
Web talk shows